The Cyclo-cross Namur, also called the Citadelcross, is a cyclo-cross race in Namur, Belgium. The track is on the hills around the citadel there. First held in 2009, it was originally part of the Gazet van Antwerpen Trophy but became part of the UCI Cyclo-cross World Cup in the 2011–2012 season.

The track is considered one of the heaviest and sometimes compared to a mountain-bike track.

Winners

Male

Female

References

UCI Cyclo-cross World Cup
Cycle races in Belgium
Cyclo-cross races
Recurring sporting events established in 2009
2009 establishments in Belgium
Sport in Namur (city)